Uroš Šerbec (born 15 February 1968) is a Slovenian handball player. He competed in the men's tournament at the 2000 Summer Olympics.

References

1968 births
Living people
Slovenian male handball players
Olympic handball players of Slovenia
Handball players at the 2000 Summer Olympics
Sportspeople from Celje